No Treason is a composition of three essays by individualist anarchist Lysander Spooner, all written in 1867: No. 1, No. 2: "The Constitution", and No. 6: "The Constitution of no Authority". No essays between No. 2 and No. 6 were ever published under the authorship of Spooner.

Overview
A lawyer by training, a strong abolitionist, radical thinker, and anarchist, Spooner wrote these specific pamphlets in order to express his discontent with the state and its legitimizing documents in the United States, the U.S. Constitution. He strongly believed in the idea of natural law, which he also described as "the science of justice," and called "the science of all human rights; of all man's rights of person and property; of all his rights to life, liberty, and the pursuit of happiness". 

Natural law, as Spooner saw it, was to be part of everyone's life, which includes the rights given at birth: life, liberty, and the pursuit of happiness. The framers of the United States government also saw natural law to be a good basis for the creation of the Constitution. Its preamble implies that the powers of the U.S government come from "the People". Spooner believed that "if there be such a principle as justice, or natural law, it is the principle, or law, that tells us what rights were given to every human being at his birth". This means that Spooner believed that everyone has the same rights from birth, regardless of color or sex or state decree.

Being against the Civil War as being about conquest, when it should have been about slavery, and witnessing the hardships brought along by the Reconstruction Era, Spooner felt the Constitution completely violated natural law; thus, it was voided. By allowing for the institution of slavery to take place, the United States was taking away the basic rights of the many slaves who were born in American soil. According to Spooner, the slave's rights were to be the same as everyone else's due to their birth qualifications. As an outspoken abolitionist, Spooner did not believe that any American should be treated differently under the natural law.

In the years prior to writing No Treason, Lysander Spooner had already expressed his disapproval of slavery in his essay The Unconstitutionality of Slavery (1845, 1860), considered a "comprehensive, libertarian theory of constitutional interpretation" by many abolitionists of his time. His main argument fell under the idea that slavery was not mentioned in the Constitution:

The constitution itself contains no designation, description, or necessary admission of the existence of such a thing as slavery, servitude, or the right of property in man. We are obliged to go out of the instrument and grope among the records of oppression, lawlessness and crimerecords unmentioned, and of course unsanctioned by the constitutionto find the thing, to which it is said that the words of the constitution apply. And when we have found this thing, which the constitution dare not name, we find that the constitution has sanctioned it (if at all) only by enigmatical words, by unnecessary implication and inference, by innuendo and double entendre, and under a name that entirely fails of describing the thing.

While each of Spooner's three essays claims voidance of the Constitution, each focuses on specific aspects.

No Treason No. 1

Summary 
The question of treason is distinct from that of slavery; and is the same that it would have been, if free States, instead of slave States, had seceded. On the part of the North, the war was carried on, not to liberate the slaves, but by a government that had always perverted and violated the Constitution, to keep the slaves in bondage; and was still willing to do so, if the slaveholders could thereby [be] induced to stay in the Union. The principle, on which the war was waged by the North, was simply this: That men may rightfully be compelled to submit to, and support, a government that they do not want; and that resistance, on their part, makes them traitors and criminals.

Spooner's first pamphlet starts by questioning the reasons for the Civil War, as it was justified under the idea of unity among the citizens of the United States. However, he believed slavery was more important, and found it outrageous that the North allowed for the institution of slavery by not finding ways of ending it in the South. He makes commentary on the funding of the Civil War by the North, and questions the idea of consent directly stated under the United States Constitution. He finds problems with the Constitution indicating that it has been created under everyone's consent, "the people's" consent. Spooner acknowledges the fact that total consent is not possible in a democratic government and mentions the separation of majorities and minorities. Additionally, Spooner questions how majority influence may have had more impact on the creation of the nation, instead of everyone, questioning once more the idea of consent and what makes a nation under consent.

The text 
Written in 1867, as the shortest of the three essays, No Treason No.1 serves as an introduction to Spooner's idea of the non-validity of the United States Constitution. He begins this work with a brief introductory section about the relationship between slavery and the Civil War as viewed by the North. First, Spooner argues that the North was involved with slavery by simply allowing for its institution to take place in the South in order for the Southern states to remain part of the Union. He then quickly moves to discuss the actual war and how many Americans were not in agreement with the decisions of the government of the United States or its ideals, which triggered a desire for secession. Spooner mentioned that those who were non-accepting of the government of the United States faced a type of slavery. While not going under physical slavery, these men had to abide by the rules of the land which denied them "ownership of themselves and the products of their labor". If those who are against the state were to do something about it they could be deemed traitors, which Spooner does not feel to be a fair response from the government. The fact that many Americans did not agree with the government of the United States questions the idea of unanimous consent. Because of this belief that not everyone will always be in absolute agreement with the decisions of government, Spooner argues "the Constitution itself should be at once overthrown", and proceeds to support his claim.

Section 1 mentions the justification given by the North for its participation in the Civil War: to maintain the union of the country, both North and South. Because consent was given by the people to separate from the power of England, and the same concept is part of the foundations for the Constitution, the North was able to participate in the Civil War, while affecting the lives of thousands as well as spending millions of dollars. Spooner is outraged at the fact that the state claims to act in the name of liberty and a free government and questions the idea of consent to it himself.

Section 2 then poses the question: "What, then, is implied in a government's resting on consent?". In this section, Spooner expands on his questioning of consent and whether it truly exists. He earlier challenged this idea with the Civil War since it is not "consistent for the North to wage war for government based on consent in order to make the South live under the rule of a government it does not want". However, the outcome of the war introduces the idea of a majority containing the consent over everyone. This poses as a problem, as the Constitution states that its creation was based under everyone's consent; therefore, everyone should have a say in what goes on with the state. With that in mind, Spooner expresses his argument against consent to the majority in seven points that act as closing arguments for this specific section:

 A man's natural right is his own; therefore, no one should try to impose authority over him.
 It is not acceptable that the majority creates government over the minority. There needs to be equality of thought and opinion regardless of numbers.
 The Constitution does not mention that it was created by the majority, but by "the people", i.e. everyone.
 Our Forefathers did not claim that majorities should rule, for they themselves were a minority.
 Majority rule does not guarantee a just decision.
 If a government is established by force and with the support of a majority, the members of such have fallen under ignorance and corruption.
 Allowing for a majority to have power over a minority simply creates a contest of ideas between members of each group.

Section 3 questions how a nation comes to existence, and what is the justification of why the United States remains a nation. "By what right, then, did we become 'a nation?' By what right do we continue to be 'a nation?' And by why right do either the strongest, or the most numerous, party, now existing within the territorial limits, called 'The United States,' claim that there really is such 'a nation' as the United States?". The idea of majority vote and the influence of majority is engraved in this section as well as that of consent. Spooner mentions how consent resides within each person, and that numbers should not dictate who starts entities such as political groups. Therefore, in order for a government to work, consent needs to be present from the people.

Section 4 then restates the question "What is implied in a government resting on consent?". Spooner looks at the direct role consent in decision-making in government and how members of a government who live under consent do so by participating in voting, taxation, or any personal service. The problem with equating consent with any type of participation for the state, Spooner argues, cannot be fully achieved, because not everyone necessarily agrees with the ways of showing consent or even with the ideas provided by the government.

The pamphlet asks: what happens to the people who are not in agreement of the forms of showing consent? What happens to the people who do not believe in the ideals that established the United States? According to the law, it means treason, and Spooner explains: "Clearly this individual consent is indispensable to the idea of treason; for if a man has never consented or agreed to support a government, he breaks no faith in refusing to support it. And if he makes war upon it, he does so as an open enemy, and not as a traitor that is, as a betrayer, or treacherous friend". Spooner's concern with treason is that the act of not accepting the ideas of the government should not allow for that person to be considered a traitor.

His greatest example is that of the American Revolution against Britain. Just like many Americans were not fond of the British Crown, many newly established Americans did not agree with the doctrine of the newly formed American government. However, when the men and women lived under the rule of the British Crown decided to express their thoughts and act as individuals, their consent was present by not allowing for the rule of Britain to take over their lives, and proceeding to revolt against the British Empire. "It was, therefore, as individuals, and only as individuals, each acting for himself alone, that they declared that their consent that is, their individual consent for each one could consent only for himself—was necessary to the creation or perpetuity of any government that they could rightfully be called to support". With this being said, Spooner shows that individualism is extremely important. It allows for new ideas to emerge, ideas that can actually help the government. The problem with individualism, however, is that it can also isolate membership from the government, which is not desired by the United States. Still, Spooner does not believe it treason should be alleged when one is open about their opinion.

In closing the section, Spooner looks on the idea of voluntary belonging to political parties and groups. He argues that it is a natural right to belong where one desires, and that allows for direct, indirect, or no involvement of one's government. As long as there is no imminent danger present because of one's beliefs against the government, everyone's voice should be respected.

No Treason No. 6
The Constitution of No Authority
Spooner, a lawyer, starts "No Authority" by examining its potential validity as a binding contract, pointing out that the U.S. Constitution could have no inherent, lasting authority, except as a contract between men, and that it only claims to be one between the people existing when it was written.

Quoting the famous preamble of the Constitution, Spooner then goes on to say that though it cites "posterity", it does not claim to have any power to bind that posterity.

He then compares the Constitution's authority to a corporation: The corporation can exist past the lifespan of its original owners, but only by people taking ownership of it voluntarily over time, not by some kind of forced ownership by descendants.

Additionally, he points out that even if voting counts as voluntarily taking ownership, only about one sixth of Americans (at that time, when slavery had just ended and women could not vote) had historically been allowed to vote. Even then, only those who voted for an American politician could be said to have consented to the Constitution, not those who voted against, and only for the span of time he voted for (every two years, for example).

Even voting, Spooner argues, is not consensual itself, because each potential voter is faced with the choice of either voting, which makes him a master of others, or abstaining, which makes him a slave of those who do vote. And those whose supported candidate loses can't really be considered to have bindingly supported the Constitution, as they lost, and anyway some may vote specifically with the intent of undermining the Constitution.

He then tallies all people who might claim to support the constitution, making a case for why each general grouping of them do not actually support it or have the capacity for informed consent. For example, those who would use it for legal plunder, and those who do not really understand it, or else they would not support it.

Taxes, Lysander states, cannot be claimed as proof of consent, because they are compulsory, therefore not consensual. An honest robber, he says, at least doesn't claim to be protecting you, or to impose his will upon you after receipt of your money. He describes government as a group of dishonest robbers who will not rob you directly, but will secretly appoint one of their member to come and rob you in their name, going on to describe a typical protection racket.

He then describes a scenario in which people who resist subjugation might be killed, even by the hundreds of thousands. Written in 1867, this reflects the recent conquest of the Confederate States of America by the US. Spooner was an outspoken abolitionist (writing The Unconstitutionality of Slavery in 1845) and advocate of universal freedom and natural rights, but he had been horrified by the brutality of the war, and the lack of legitimate constitution basis for violently conquering people who wanted to leave a federation that had been consensually joined only by their ancestors.

See also 
 List of books about anarchism

References

External links

 Lysander Spooner.org
 No Treason, all three volumes, free download

Books about anarchism
1867 essays
United States constitutional commentary